Sirk'i (Aymara for wart, also spelled Serkhe) is a  mountain in the Andes of Bolivia east of Poopó Lake. It is located in the Oruro Department, Sebastián Pagador Province, which is identical to the Santiago de Huari Municipality. Sirk'i lies northwest of  Chullpiri and east of Wila Sirka.

The Jach'a Qala River ("big stone", also spelled Jachcha Khala) originates northwest of the mountain. It flows to the south.

See also 
 Chullpiri

References 

Mountains of Oruro Department